The Moloka'i Hoe is an annual outrigger canoe race between the islands of Molokai and Oahu, Hawaii.  The race is one of Hawaii's largest annual sporting events, drawing participants from Hawaii and the U.S. mainland as well as internationally.  Participating countries include Australia, New Zealand, England, Germany, Japan, Hong Kong, and Tahiti.

Canoes launch from the Hale o Lono Harbor off the west side of Molokai and travel approximately 41 miles across the Kaiwi Channel to Fort DeRussy beach, Waikiki. The channel is said to be one of the most treacherous spans of ocean in the world, with the current record time for the passage being under 5 hours.

Canoes
The canoes used for the race are roughly 40 feet long by about 2 feet wide and weigh about 400 lbs each. Each canoe is stabilized by an ama, a 10 foot long float connected to the canoe by two wooden struts called iako.

Teams
Six paddlers sit evenly spaced inside the canoe. A steersman sits at the back and controls the canoe's course with his paddle. The person in the lead seat sets the pace. All paddlers except for the steersman stroke on alternate sides of the canoe.  At predetermined intervals, the person sitting in the second seat calls for paddlers to switch sides.

Early race crews consisted of 6 men who paddled the entire distance.  Today's crews consist of 9-10 members, of which those not paddling follow in an escort boat.  Crew changes occur every 20–30 minutes in mid-channel. During these changes, paddlers exit the canoe on one side while their relief enters from the other side.

History
The first contest, held in October 1952, consisted of three competing koa wood outrigger canoes of six men each. The course at that time was 38 miles long, starting from Molokai’s northwestern Kawakiu Bay. The first canoe reached the Waikiki finish line 8 hours and 55 minutes later.

Na Wahine O Ke Kai (Women of the Sea)
A women's equivalent of the Molokai Hoe was proposed two years after the first men's race, but coaches and officials believed the Kaiwi Channel was too treacherous for women to participate.  In 1975, two crews made the first unofficial crossing.  Since then, the women's race attracts up to 80 crews and 700 paddlers each year.  The women's race also covers a 41-mile stretch, starting at Hale O Lono at Molokai's southeast corner and finishing at the Hilton Hotel on Oahu. The current women's race record is a little under 5 1/2 hours.

Further reading
Official site
Official Na Wahine O Ke Kai site

References

1952 establishments in Hawaii
Annual sporting events in the United States
Recurring sporting events established in 1952
Canoe racing
Hawaii culture
Sports competitions in Hawaii